The 'Original' Bad Co. Anthology (also The 'Original' Bad Company Anthology) is a compilation album released by Bad Company in 1999 on Elektra Records. In addition to the band's classic hits, it also features four new songs ― the first since 1982 to feature original lead singer Paul Rodgers ― three B-sides and three previously unreleased outtakes. Technical information was retrieved from the 1999 Edition released by Elektra Records. Most of the songs on the album were previously released on Swan Song Records. The tracks "Tracking Down a Runaway", "Ain't It Good", "Hammer of Love" and "Hey, Hey" were new songs recorded especially for this release. The compilation notably omits the tracks "Young Blood", "Gone, Gone, Gone" and "Electricland", all of which were fairly big hits with Rodgers.

Track listing

Disc 1 
 "Can't Get Enough" (Mick Ralphs), from Bad Company (1974)
 "Rock Steady" (Paul Rodgers), from Bad Company
 "Ready for Love" (Ralphs), from Bad Company
 "Bad Company" (Rodgers, Simon Kirke), from Bad Company
 "Movin' On" (Ralphs), from Bad Company
 "Seagull" (Rodgers, Ralphs), from Bad Company
 "Superstar Woman" (Rodgers), previously unreleased (1974), later re-recorded for use on Paul's solo album Cut Loose (1983)
 "Little Miss Fortune" (Rodgers), taken from the B-side of the UK/US single "Can't Get Enough" (1974)
 "Good Lovin' Gone Bad" (Ralphs), from Straight Shooter (1975)
 "Feel Like Makin' Love" (Rodgers, Ralphs), from Straight Shooter
 "Shooting Star" (Rodgers), from Straight Shooter
 "Deal with the Preacher" (Rodgers, Ralphs), from Straight Shooter
 "Wild Fire Woman" (Rodgers, Ralphs), from Straight Shooter
 "Easy on My Soul" (Rodgers), taken from the B-side of the US single "Movin' On" (1974)
 "Whiskey Bottle" (Rodgers, Ralphs), taken from the B-side of the US single "Good Lovin' Gone Bad" (1975)

Disc 2 
 "Honey Child" (Rodgers, Ralphs, Kirke, Boz Burrell), from Run with the Pack (1976)
 "Run with the Pack" (Rodgers), from Run with the Pack
 "Silver, Blue and Gold" (Rodgers), from Run with the Pack
 "Do Right by Your Woman" (Rodgers), alternate version from Run with the Pack
 "Burnin' Sky" (Rodgers), from Burnin' Sky (1977)
 "Heartbeat" (Rodgers), from Burnin' Sky
 "Too Bad" (Ralphs), from Burnin' Sky
 "Smokin' 45" (Peter Sinfield, Burrell, Tim Hinckley), previously unreleased (1976)
 "Rock 'n' Roll Fantasy" (Rodgers), from Desolation Angels (1979)
 "Evil Wind" (Rodgers), from Desolation Angels
 "Oh, Atlanta" (Ralphs), from Desolation Angels
 "Rhythm Machine" (Kirke, Burrell), from Desolation Angels
 "Untie the Knot" (Rodgers, Kirke), from Rough Diamonds (1982)
 "Downhill Ryder" (Rodgers), from Rough Diamonds
 "Tracking Down a Runaway" (Rodgers), new track recorded 1998
 "Ain't It Good" (Ralphs), new track recorded 1998
 "Hammer of Love" (Rodgers, Cynthia Kereluk), new track recorded 1998
 "Hey, Hey" (Ralphs), new track recorded 1998

Charts
Album - The 'Original' Bad Co. Anthology - Billboard (United States)

Singles - Billboard (United States)

Technical information
Produced by Paul Rodgers for Bad Company
Total album time: 138 Minutes

References

Bad Company compilation albums
1999 greatest hits albums
Elektra Records compilation albums